Statue of Martin Luther King or Martin Luther King statue or similar, may refer to:

 Martin Luther King Jr. Memorial (Washington D.C.)
 The Embrace, Boston, Massachusetts
 Statue of Martin Luther King Jr. (Denver), Colorado, USA
 Statue of Martin Luther King Jr. (Pueblo, Colorado), USA
 Statue of Martin Luther King Jr. (Atlanta), Georgia, USA
 Statue of Martin Luther King Jr. (Newark), New Jersey, USA
 Dr. Martin Luther King, Jr. Memorial Sculpture (The Dream), Portland, Oregon, USA
 Statue of Martin Luther King Jr. (Austin, Texas), USA
 Statue of Martin Luther King Jr. (Houston), Texas, USA
 Statue of Martin Luther King Jr. (Milwaukee), Wisconsin, USA
 Statue of Martin Luther King Jr. (Mexico City), Mexico

See also
 Bust of Martin Luther King (disambiguation)
 Martin Luther King (disambiguation)
 MLK (disambiguation)